Haris Redžepi (born 20 July 1988) is a Bosnian-Herzegovinian footballer playing with BGH City FC in the Canadian Soccer League.

Playing career

Club
Born in Sarajevo, SR Bosnia and Herzegovina, SFR Yugoslavia, he played with FK Željezničar Sarajevo between 2006 till 2009 in the Premier League of Bosnia and Herzegovina. In summer 2009, he moved to NK Karlovac and played with them in the 2009–10 Prva HNL. In summer 2010, he returned to Bosnia and joined NK Travnik for the next two and a half years. Between his two tenures with Travnik he had a short spell with MFK Košice in the Slovak Corgoň Liga in the 2011–12 season. During the winter break of the 2012–13 season he moved to Serbia and joined the SuperLiga side FK Novi Pazar. 

A year later he returned to Bosnia to play with FK Sloboda Tuzla. The sixth of August 2014 he left Sloboda and joined Olimpic Sarajevo. Shortly after he signed with FK Goražde in the First League of the Federation of Bosnia and Herzegovina. In 2015, he went abroad once more to play in the Canadian Soccer League with Brantford Galaxy. In 2019, he signed with Hamilton City SC for the 2019 CSL season.  

After the merger between Hamilton with Brantford Galaxy he played with BGH City FC for the 2021 season.

Managerial career 
In 2016, he served as an assistant coach for two seasons with Brantford Galaxy. In 2019, he became associated with ProStars FC as an academy coach.

References

1988 births
Living people
Footballers from Sarajevo
Association football forwards
Bosnia and Herzegovina footballers
FK Željezničar Sarajevo players
NK Karlovac players
NK Travnik players
FC VSS Košice players
FK Novi Pazar players
FK Sloboda Tuzla players
FK Olimpik players
FK Goražde players
Brantford Galaxy players
Hamilton City SC players
Premier League of Bosnia and Herzegovina players
Croatian Football League players
Slovak Super Liga players
Serbian SuperLiga players
Canadian Soccer League (1998–present) players
Bosnia and Herzegovina expatriate footballers
Expatriate footballers in Croatia
Bosnia and Herzegovina expatriate sportspeople in Croatia
Expatriate footballers in Slovakia
Bosnia and Herzegovina expatriate sportspeople in Slovakia
Expatriate footballers in Serbia
Bosnia and Herzegovina expatriate sportspeople in Serbia
Expatriate soccer players in Canada
Bosnia and Herzegovina expatriate sportspeople in Canada
First League of the Federation of Bosnia and Herzegovina players